Gustav Sandgren (20 August 1904 – 11 August 1983) was a Swedish writer.

Early life and writing
Sandgren's parents were O.J. Sandgren and Karolina Adolfsson, who gave their son a poor but happy childhood. The father was, in addition to his work, a fiddler. Their son Gustav had since childhood, both heard and played on the fiddle—a musical instrument which he handled with skill throughout life. He was fascinated by folklore, mystery and dreams.

After school Sandgren became a labourer and worked for five years at Cloetta chocolate in Ljungsbro. He eventually became a full-time writer, and was to have 47 books behind him when he died in 1983. He also wrote poetry collections (a few written with his life partner Ria Wägner). Together with Harry Martinson, Artur Lundkvist, Erik Asklund and Josef Kjellgren, he formed the literary group Fem unga ("Five young ones"). Other accomplishments include fairy tales, and children's books. Sometimes he wrote under the pseudonym Gabriel Linde. The last name Linde referred to the croft where he stayed in the summer of 1933, located about a kilometre southeast of Norrvrå station in Hölö, Södermanland.

Personal life
He married Titti Lindstedt in 1935. They lived in Björknäs at Hållsviken west of Trosa in Södermanland. In 1945 he left his wife for Ria Wägner, with whom he lived for forty years at Lidingö, Stockholm. The couple had a daughter, author Veronica Wägner, born in 1947.

References

External links
Swedish Wikipedia, which includes a list of Sangren's publications

1904 births
1983 deaths
People from Motala Municipality
Writers from Östergötland
Swedish-language writers